Knowltonia is a genus of beetles in the family Buprestidae, containing the following species:

 Knowltonia alleni (Cazier, 1938)
 Knowltonia atrifasciata (LeConte, 1873)
 Knowltonia biramosa Fisher, 1935
 Knowltonia calida (Knull, 1958)

References

Buprestidae genera